Thomond may also refer to:
 The Kingdom of Thomond, ruled by the Dal gCais
 The Principality of Thomond, a fictitious microstate
 Thomond College of Education, Limerick, a teacher training college
 Thomond Park, Limerick, a sports stadium of Munster Rugby
 Thomond Villas, old army barracks at Clarecastle
 Thomond Bridge, an old bridge across the River Shannon
 Thomondgate, a district associated with Limerick